Ripe was a comune (municipality) in the Province of Ancona in the Italian region Marche, located about  west of Ancona.

The municipality of Ripe was disbanded 1 January 2014 and united to Castel Colonna and Monterado in the new municipality of Trecastelli.

Town hall of the new administration was set in former Ripe's offices in Piazza Castello, 1

Demographic evolution

References

Cities and towns in the Marche
Trecastelli